The 2009–10 NC State Wolfpack women's basketball team represents North Carolina State University in the 2009–10 women's college basketball season. The team is coached by Kellie Harper and plays its home games in Reynolds Coliseum in Raleigh, NC. The Wolfpack is a member of the Atlantic Coast Conference.

2009–10 Roster

2009–10 Schedule

|-
!colspan=9| Exhibition

|-
!colspan=9| Regular Season

|-
!colspan=9| ACC tournament

|-
!colspan=9| NCAA tournament

Postseason Awards
Marissa Kastanek–2010 ACC Freshman of the Year
Bonae Holston–2010 All–ACC Women's Basketball Honorable Mention 
Bonae Holston–2010 ACC All–Tournament First Team
Nikitta Gartrell–2010 ACC All–Tournament First Team
Marissa Kastanek–2010 ACC All–Tournament Second Team

See also
NC State Wolfpack women's basketball
2010 NCAA Division I women's basketball tournament
2009–10 NCAA Division I women's basketball season
2009–10 NC State Wolfpack men's basketball team

References

Nc State
NC State Wolfpack women's basketball seasons
NC State
NC State Wolf
NC State Wolf